Borden Farm is a historic farm at 2951 and 2967 East Main Road in Portsmouth, Rhode Island. The property has been owned by descendants of the Borden family since the early 1700s. The main house is a c. 1865 Second Empire structure built by William Borden; there is also an English barn dating to about 1890, along with a workshop, granary, and wellhouse all dating to about 1900.

The farm was listed on the National Register of Historic Places in 2007.

See also
National Register of Historic Places listings in Newport County, Rhode Island

References

Houses on the National Register of Historic Places in Rhode Island
Second Empire architecture in Rhode Island
Houses completed in 1865
Houses in Newport County, Rhode Island
Buildings and structures in Portsmouth, Rhode Island
National Register of Historic Places in Newport County, Rhode Island